Khufi is one of the Pamir languages of Tajikistan's Gorno-Badakhshan Autonomous Region. It is closely related to, and traditionally considered a dialect of, Shughni, but is quite distinct. It is spoken in the villages of Khuf and Pastkhuf in the Khufdara River gorge — a right-hand tributary of Panj that descends from the Rushan Range south of the Bartang River and the town of Rushan.

References

See also
Памирские языки in Russian Wikipedia.

Languages of Tajikistan